Benjamin Di Rosa (born August 10, 1998) is an American professional soccer player who plays as a defender.

Early life
Di Rosa played youth soccer with Bethesda SC.

College career
In 2017, Di Rosa attended the University of Maryland, College Park to play college soccer. He made his debut on August 25, 2017 against the Santa Clara Broncos.  In 2018, Di Rosa scored his first goal in the national semifinal against Indiana during Maryland's National Championship run. With Maryland, he won the 2018 National Championship and was named to the College Cup All-Tournament Team. He scored his second goal on September 16, 2019, to give Maryland a 1-0 victory over the Villanova Wildcats.

Club career
On January 21, 2021, Di Rosa was selected 44th overall in the 2021 MLS SuperDraft by New York City FC. Di Rosa travelled with the team during preseason, but was not signed by the club.

On April 16, 2021, Di Rosa signed with USL Championship side Charleston Battery. He made his debut on May 6, 2021, starting against New York Red Bulls II and winning Man of the Match.

In 2022, Di Rosa signed with St. Louis City SC 2  of MLS Next Pro.

Personal
Ben's twin brother, Matt, is also a professional soccer player, who played with him at the University of Maryland, and was also draft in 2021, becoming the first set of twins to be drafted in the same MLS SuperDraft.

References

External links
Maryland bio
MLS bio

1998 births
American soccer players
Association football defenders
Charleston Battery players
Living people
Maryland Terrapins men's soccer players
New York City FC draft picks
Soccer players from Washington, D.C.
USL Championship players
MLS Next Pro players
St. Louis City SC 2 players